Miomir Dašić (15 November 1930 – 28 October 2020) was a Montenegrin historian and a regular member of the Montenegrin Academy of Sciences and Arts.

Biography

Early life and education
Miomir Dašić was born to a wealthy peasant family (first of eight children) in a small village of Rovca, near Berane. He started elementary school in 1937, in Rovca, after which he attended Berane's gymnasium in 1941, just days before Nazi invasion of Yugoslavia. Gymnasium and all other educational institutions were de facto out of work during the period between 1941 and 1945, therefore Dašić was able to continue his studies at the end of the war. He was awarded baccalaureate in June 1949, after finishing gymnasium education. In 1954 he graduated from Faculty of Philosophy in Belgrade, with a bachelor's degree in history. That same year he started working as a professor in Berane's gymnasium, until 1960. After 6 years of working as a professor he applied for post-graduate studies, also on Faculty of Philosophy in Belgrade. He obtained his master's degree in history in 1961. Later he received a doctorate degree from Faculty of Philosophy, with a thesis "Montenegro and liberation movement in Gornje Polimlje from the start of 19th century until the Congress of Berlin".

Montenegrin Academy of Sciences and Arts awarded Dašić with a high scientific recognition in 1991 and he became a regular member of the academy in 1997. Miomir Dašić had numerous study visits at universities across Europe: in Paris (1958, 1961, 1973, 1974, 1979), Utrecht (1982), Krakow (1978, 1981), among others.

Bibliography
In six decades of his work Dašić published 12 books, around 270 case studies, arguments, articles and history essays, as well as 420 critical reviews and recessions. He also published more than 130 scientific and expert reports, while bibliography of his work has 830 units in it.

 Oslobodilački pokret u Donjim Vasojevićima 1861. i 1862. i njegov ođek u Sandžaku (1982)
 Vasojevići od pomena do 1860. godine (1986) 
 Uvod u istoriju sa osnovama pomoćnih istorijskih nauka (1988) 
 Vasojevići u ustancima 1860‒1878.godine (1992)
 Karađorđevići iz Vasojevića (1996) 
 Ogledi iz istorije Crne Gore (Studije o događajima od XVIII vijeka do 1918) (2000) 
 Nezaobilazno u istoriografiji Crne Gore (prilozi nauci) (2003)
 Šekular i Šekularci od pomena do 1941 (2006)
 Biobibliografija akademika Miomira Dašića (2006)
 Rovca kod Berana (2008)
 O istoričarima CANU (2011) 
 Sporenja u istoriografiji. O vrlinama i manama „Učiteljice života“(Podgorica – Bijelo Polje, 2014)

References

1930 births
2020 deaths
People from Berane
Montenegrin historians
Members of the Montenegrin Academy of Sciences and Arts